Muzaffarnagar district of Uttar Pradesh is divided into four tehsils (sub-districts):

Tehsils of Uttar Pradesh
Muzaffarnagar district